Zarghūn Khār (Pashto: زرغون ښار), Zarghūn Shār (Dari: زرغون شهر) or Zarghūn Shār-e ‘Alī Kheyl (Dari: زرغون شهر علی خیل), is a large irrigated area in Mohammad Agha District, Logar Province, eastern Afghanistan. It is west of the Pastah Plains and south of the Qal‘ah-ye Dowlat Plains, and supports the villages of Shah Qal‘ah, Mālī Khēl, Deh Mēnah, ‘Alī Khēl and Deh-e Manakah.

The Shrine of Khwaja Sadr-e Awlia 
In Zarghun Shar lies the shrine of Khwaja Sadr-e Awlia. The site is a popular place of pilgrimage, attracting visitors from around the province.

Notes

Logar Province
Populated places in Logar Province